Paraspilarctia is a genus of moths in the family Erebidae. It occurs in China, Taiwan, and northern Vietnam.

Species

Subgenus Paraspilarctia Kôda, 1988 
 Paraspilarctia magna (Wileman, 1910)

Subgenus Kishidarctia Dubatolov, 2003 
 Paraspilarctia klapperichi (Daniel, 1943)

References
 , 2003: Three new genera of Chinese Arctiinae (Lepidoptera, Arctiidae). Tinea 17 (5): 255-265, Tokyo.
 , 2010: Tiger-moths of Eurasia (Lepidoptera, Arctiidae) (Nyctemerini by ). Neue Entomologische Nachrichten 65: 1-106, Marktleuthen.
Natural History Museum Lepidoptera generic names catalog

Spilosomina
Moth genera